Canton Township is one of twenty-six townships in Fulton County, Illinois, USA.  As of the 2010 census, its population was 15,703 and it contained 6,376 housing units.

Geography

Cities, towns, villages
 Canton (vast majority)
 Norris (south half)

Unincorporated towns
 Brereton
 East Lawndale
 Prospect Heights Addition
 Village Square
 Westview Acres
(This list is based on USGS data and may include former settlements.)

Cemeteries
The township contains these seven cemeteries: Greenwood, Hanson, Johnson, Norris, Saint Josephs, Saint Marys and White Chapel.

Major highways
  Illinois Route 9
  Illinois Route 78

Airports and landing strips
 Ingersoll Airport

Lakes
 Van Winkle Lake

Landmarks
 Big Creek Park
 Graham Hosp

Demographics

School districts
 Canton Union School District 66

Political districts
 Illinois's 17th congressional district
 State House District 91
 State Senate District 46

References
 
 United States Census Bureau 2007 TIGER/Line Shapefiles
 United States National Atlas

External links
 City-Data.com
 Illinois State Archives

Townships in Fulton County, Illinois
Townships in Illinois